Petosiris, called Ankhefenkhons, was the high priest of Thoth at Hermopolis and held various priestly degrees in the service of Sakhmet, Khnum, Amen-Re and Hathor. 

Petosiris was the son of Sishu and Nefer-renpet. He lived in the second half of the 4th century BCE, during the 28th Dynasty. In his tomb, located in the necropolis at Tuna el-Gebel, Petosiris prided himself on having re-established the fortunes of the temples in which he served.

There is a pseudepigraphic onomantic text, Petosiris to Nechepso, and it is possible that the priestly Petosiris described in this article is the inspiration for the attribution of authorship. Nechepso lived in the 7th century BCE and that the text is likely 2nd century BCE.

Notes

References
 Lefebvre, Gustave: Le Tombeau de Petosiris,  L'institut Français d'archéologie orientale, Cairo, 1924
 Lichtheim, Miriam: Ancient Egyptian Literature, Vol.3, University of California Press 1980, pp. 44ff.
 Caroli, Christian A.: Ptolemaios I. Soter - Herrscher zweier Kulturen, Badawi Artes Afro Arabica, 2007, pp. 148–158.

External links

 The biography of Petosiris
 The tomb of Petosiris

Ancient Egyptian priests